The German Type IXA submarine was a sub-class of the German Type IX submarine built for Nazi Germany's Kriegsmarine between 1937 and 1938. These U-boats were designed between 1935 and 1936 and were intended to be fairly large ocean-going submarines. The inspiration for the Type IXA submarine came from the German Type IA submarine, which had a similar diving depth and identical submerged horsepower.

Two of the eight Type IXA submarines ( and ) would become the 6th and 10th most successful U-boats that saw service in World War II, sinking 53 and 35 ships respectively. All of the Type IXA submarines were sunk fairly early in the war except for U-37 and U-38, which were scuttled in May 1945 to prevent them from falling into the hands of the Allies.

Construction
All Type IXA submarines were ordered by the Kriegsmarine between 29 July 1936 and 21 November 1936 as part of Plan Z and the overall German plan of re-armament in violation of the Treaty of Versailles. The design of the IXA submarines was derived from the German Type IA submarine. All contracts for the construction of the submarines were awarded to DeSchiMAG AG Weser, Bremen. The first U-boat to be laid down in the Bremen ship yards was U-37, whose keel was laid down on 15 March 1937. By November 1939, all eight submarines had been fully constructed and commissioned into the Kriegsmarine.

Design

General characteristics
The Type IXA submarines were the first German submarines to have a double hull. This allowed for a greater chance of survival in the event of an attack and gave them better seaworthiness on the surface. The class had two MAN M 9 V 40/46 supercharged 9-cylinder diesel engines that produced  as well as two SSW 2 GU 345/34 double-acting electric motors that produced  and allowed them to travel at  while surfaced and  submerged. The maximum crew capacity was 56, though the number on board was usually around 45–48.

Armament
The Type IXA submarines had six torpedo tubes (four in the bow and two in the stern) and carried a total of twenty-two  torpedoes. Twelve torpedoes were stowed internally and ten were in the topside deck containers. In order to get the torpedoes into the forward or bow torpedo room, the torpedoes were lifted over the U-boat by a crane. The crew would then pull the torpedo inside the vessel using a cradle that was set at an angle to allow the torpedo to slide into position inside the torpedo room. To reload a torpedo tube with a torpedo from one of the above-deck canisters, the submarine would have to surface in calm water. Then the torpedo would be pulled out of the compartment with winches and lowered into the forward or bow torpedo room. This process could take several hours for just one torpedo, during which the U-boat was unable to dive, making it an easy target for Allied aircraft.

The Type IXA submarines were equipped with a  L/45 deck gun on a Utof mounting forward of the conning tower. Shell storage was 180 rounds. Training and elevation was manual. The rate of fire was 15 rounds per minute.
They were also armed with 2 cm FlaK 30 and  anti-aircraft guns. The 2 cm FlaK 30 guns had a range of  firing at up to 280 rounds per minute; firing against aircraft the ceiling was reduced to 3,700 m.

List of Type IXA U-boats
The Type IXA class had eight U-boats, all of which were built by AG Weser of Bremen. After being commissioned and deployed, the Type IXA submarines were stationed in the German port city of Wilhelmshaven.

U-37

U-37 was laid down by AG Weser of Bremen on 15 March 1937. Following just over a year of construction, she was launched from the Bremen shipyards on 14 May 1938 and commissioned into the Kriegsmarine on 4 August 1938 under the command of Kapitänleutnant Heinrich Schuch as a member of the 6th U-boat Flotilla. In spite of these victories, U-37 was later withdrawn from combat service and was used for training submarine crews until the end of the war. On 8 May 1945, the crew of U-37 scuttled the U-boat in Sonderburg Bay off Flensburg to keep her from falling into the hands of the Allies.

U-38

The keel for U-38 was laid down on 15 April 1937 and after over a year and a half of construction she was commissioned on 24 October 1938 with Oberleutnant zur See Heinrich Liebe in command. Upon commissioning, U-38 was assigned to the 6th U-boat Flotilla. Like U-37, U-38 conducted eleven patrols. During these patrols she managed to sink or damage over 30 enemy vessels. Like U-37, U-38 ranks as one of the most successful U-boats of World War II, holding 10th place. With World War II drawing to a disastrous close for Germany, U-38 was scuttled by her own crew west of Wesermünde on 5 May 1945.

U-39

The keel for U-39 was laid down on 2 June 1937. She was commissioned over a year later on 10 December 1938 with Kapitänleutnant Gerhard Glattes in command as a member of the 6th U-boat Flotilla. All of her crew members survived and were captured by the British. U-39 was the first German U-boat to be sunk in World War II.

U-40

U-40 was ordered for construction on 29 July 1936 and her keel was laid down on 1 July 1937. She was launched from Bremen on 9 November 1938 and commissioned on 11 February 1939 with Kapitänleutnant Werner von Schmidt in command. U-40 conducted only two war patrols during her career, both while part of the 6th U-boat Flotilla. During her short war-time service, U-40 sank no ships. She sank on 13 October 1939 after hitting mines in the English Channel while attempting a short cut to a rendezvous with other U-boats.

U-41

U-41 was laid down on 27 November 1937 and was launched on 28 January 1939. She was commissioned into the Kriegsmarine on 22 April 1939 under the command of Oberleutnant zur See Gustav-Adolf Mugler. U-41 only undertook three war patrols, two as part of the 6th U-boat Flotilla and one as a member of the 2nd U-boat Flotilla. All 49 crew members were lost with the ship.

U-42

U-42 was ordered by the Kriegsmarine on 21 November 1936. Her keel was laid down on 21 December 1937 by AG Weser of Bremen as yard number 947. She was launched on 16 February 1939 and commissioned on 15 July 1939 with Kapitänleutnant Rolf Dau in command of the vessel. U-42 had a very short career, being sunk while still on her first war patrol. Both of U-42s patrols were as a member of the 6th U-boat Flotilla. Out of a crew of 46, twenty survived and 26 went down with the submarine.

U-43

The keel for U-43 was laid down on 15 August 1938 at the AG Weser yard at Bremen; she was launched on 23 May 1939 and commissioned on 26 August 1939 under the command of Kapitänleutnant Wilhelm Ambrosius. Between November 1939 and July 1943 the U-boat conducted 14 combat patrols as a member of the 6. Unterseebootsflottile and later the 2. U-43 was sunk on 30 July 1943 southwest of the Azores by a torpedo dropped by a United States Navy aircraft from the escort carrier ; all 55 hands were lost.

U-44

U-44 was ordered by the  Kriegsmarine on 21 November 1936 and
was laid down on 15 September 1938 by AG Weser, Bremen as yard number 949. She was launched on 5 August 1939 and commissioned on 4 November under the command of Kapitänleutnant Ludwig Mathes. On 13 March 1940, U-44 struck a mine that was located in Minefield Number 7 off the north coast of the Netherlands. All 47 of U-44s crew members went down with the submarine.

See also
German Type IX submarine

References

Bibliography

 
Submarine classes
World War II submarines of Germany